Pedro Pascual (born March 5, 1996 in Córdoba, Mexico) is an American competitive sailor. He competed at the 2016 Summer Olympics in Rio de Janeiro, in the men's RS:X, and at the 2020 Summer Olympics in Tokyo.

He qualified to represent the United States at the 2020 Summer Olympics, and proceeded to compete there in 2021.

References

External links

1996 births
Living people
American male sailors (sport)
Olympic sailors of the United States
Sailors at the 2016 Summer Olympics – RS:X
Sailors at the 2020 Summer Olympics – RS:X
Pan American Games medalists in sailing
Pan American Games silver medalists for the United States
Sailors at the 2019 Pan American Games
Medalists at the 2019 Pan American Games
American windsurfers